Mary Magdalene in the Desert (French: Marie-Madeleine au désert) is a 1886 painting by Emmanuel Benner (1836-1896). It is now in the Strasbourg Museum of Modern and Contemporary Art. Its inventory number is 55.974.0.163.

Emmanuel Benner was the twin brother of the painter Jean Benner, the son of the painter Jean Benner-Fries and the uncle of the painter Emmanuel Michel Benner (son of Jean Benner), also known as Many Benner.

The painting depicts Mary Magdalene as a voluptuous nude, reading a folio in what is purportedly a cave in a desert. The painting was exhibited at the Salon de 1886 in Paris.

References 

Paintings in the collection of the Strasbourg Museum of Modern and Contemporary Art
1886 paintings
Paintings depicting Mary Magdalene
Oil on canvas paintings
Nude art
Books in art
French paintings